Baghanwala (Urdu: باغاں والہ) is a village in Jhelum District, Pakistan, Province Punjab.

History 
This village is very old before the establishment of Pakistan. There is a very old Nandana fort of Hinduism here. A short distance from the village is the hill of Al-Biruni, where Al-Biruni measured the diameter of the earth.

Facilities 
This village has a Government Primary School for basic education for children. And there is a Government Dispensary for basic health facilities.

References 

 

Populated places in Tehsil  Pind Dadan Khan